Bodotriidae is a family of crustaceans belonging to the order Cumacea. Bodotriids have a worldwide distribution in shallow and deep waters. There are over 380 described species in over 30 genera, being the most diverse cumacean family. Their external morphology differs from other cumaceans by a combination of traits that independently are not unique to the family: the telson is fused to the last abdominal segment (last pleonite), the dorsal part of the mandible has a boat shape (naviculoid), exopods exist on the third maxilliped and the first peraeopod, and there is a uropodal endopod with one or two articles.

Anatomy
In both sexes the telson is fused with the last segment of the pleon, forming a "pleotelson". Males generally have five pairs of pleopods, although less often there may be three, two or they may be entirely absent. In females the second antenna is substantially shorter than the first. The third maxillipeds always have exopods (outer branches), and there are endopods (inner branches) on one or two segments of the uropods.

Diversity
Bodotriidae is divided into three subfamilies (Bodotriinae, Mancocumatinae, and Vaunthompsoniinae), although it has been suggested that Mancocumatinae belong to the Vaunthompsoniinae:

Bodotriinae Scott, 1901
Alticuma Day, 1978
Apocuma Jones, 1973
Atlantocuma Bacescu & Muradian, 1974
Austrocuma Day, 1978
Bacescuma Petrescu, 1998
Bodotria Goodsir, 1843
Cyclaspis Sars, 1865
Cyclaspoides Bonnier, 1896
Eocuma Marcusen, 1894
Iphinoe Bate, 1856
Mossambicuma Day, 1978
Pseudocyclaspis Edwards, 1984
Stephanomma Sars, 1871
Upselaspis Jones, 1955
Zygosiphon Calman, 1907

Mancocumatinae Watling, 1977
Mancocuma Zimmer, 1943
Pseudoleptocuma Watling, 1977
Speleocuma
Spilocuma Watling, 1977

Vaunthompsoniinae
Bathycuma Hansen, 1895
Cumopsis G. O. Sars, 1865
Gaussicuma Zimmer, 1907
Gephyrocuma Hale, 1936
Gigacuma Kurian, 1951
Glyphocuma Hale, 1944
Heterocuma Miers, 1879
Hypocuma Jones, 1973
Leptocuma Sars, 1873
Paravaunthompsonia Mühlenhardt-Siegel, 2008
Picrocuma Hale, 1936
Pomacuma Hale, 1944
Pseudosympodomma Kurian, 1954
Scyllarocuma
Sympodomma Stebbing, 1912
Vaunthompsonia Bate, 1858
Zenocuma Hale, 1944

References

External links 

Cumacea
Crustacean families